Earl Klugh is the debut album by jazz guitarist Earl Klugh, released in 1976. Klugh is accompanied by Louis Johnson on bass and Lee Ritenour on guitar.

Track listing

Personnel

Musicians

 Earl Klugh – acoustic and electric guitars
 Chuck Findley, Oscar Brashear – trumpet, flugelhorn
 Garnett Brown – trombone
 Ray Pizzi – soprano saxophone
 Pete Christlieb – tenor saxophone, flute
 Jerome Richardson – baritone saxophone, flute
 Dave Grusin – piano, synthesizer, percussion
 Lee Ritenour – electric guitar
 Charles Meeks – bass guitar
 Louis Johnson – bass
 Harvey Mason – drums, percussion
 Laudir de Oliveira – percussion
 Alexander Murray, Bernard Kundell, Charles Veal, Jr., Daniel Shindaryov, Edgar Lustgarten, Joseph Stepansky, Karen Jones, Kenneth Yerke, Marcia Van Dyke, Marie Fera, Myer Bello, Pamela Goldsmith, Ralph Schaeffer, Thelma Beach –strings

Technical
 Larry Rosen – producer
 Phil Schier – engineer
 John Golden – mastering

Charts

References 

1976 debut albums
Earl Klugh albums
EMI America Records albums